Juan Alberto Espil Vanotti (born 5 January 1968) is a retired Argentine-Italian professional basketball player, who played as a shooting guard-small forward.

Professional career
Espil's last pro club was Bahía Basket (successor of Estudiantes in the LNB), where he retired in 2012.

In February 2013, Estudiantes honoured Espil by retiring the #10 jersey that he had worn during his two tenures on the club.

National team career
Espil helped Argentina to claim the country's first ever gold medal in men's basketball at the Pan American Games, as Argentina defeated the Team USA, in the final of the 1995 Pan American Games, in Mar del Plata, Argentina.

Espil also competed with the senior men's Argentine national basketball team at the 1996 Summer Olympics in Atlanta, Georgia, where his team finished in ninth place in the overall standings.

References

External links
FIBA Archive Profile
FIBA Europe Profile
EuroCup Profile
Eurobasket.com Profile
Spanish League Profile 
Italian League Profile 

1968 births
Living people
Argentine expatriate basketball people in Spain
Argentine men's basketball players
Atenas basketball players
Basketball players at the 1995 Pan American Games
Basketball players at the 1996 Summer Olympics
Bàsquet Manresa players
Bilbao Basket players
Boca Juniors basketball players
Estudiantes de Bahía Blanca basketball players
G.E.P.U. basketball players
Italian expatriate basketball people in Spain
Italian men's basketball players
Joventut Badalona players
Liga ACB players
Obras Sanitarias basketball players
Olympic basketball players of Argentina
Pallacanestro Virtus Roma players
Pan American Games gold medalists for Argentina
Sportspeople from Buenos Aires Province
Saski Baskonia players
Shooting guards
Small forwards
Pan American Games medalists in basketball
1998 FIBA World Championship players
Medalists at the 1995 Pan American Games
1994 FIBA World Championship players